Ibrahim Pasha Mosque (from ) is an Ottoman-era mosque on the Aegean island of Rhodes, Greece. It is the oldest out of the seven mosques inside the old walled city of Rhodes, and the only one open to worship today, serving the Turkish-Muslim community of Rhodes.

History 
After the Ottomans captured Rhodes from the Knights Hospitaller in 1522, Muslim Turkish populations settled within the walled city, where new mosques were built, while others were made from converted Christian churches in order to serve the new community.

The Ibrahim Pasha Mosque was built in 1540-1541 in what is today Platonos Square by Sultan Suleiman, and is thus the oldest mosque on the island. 

The mosque's minaret had over the centuries suffered serious decay and damage. In the 1930s, where restoration works were commissioned under Italian rule. 

Although it has continuously served as a mosque, it was officially granted an operating license by the Greek Ministry of Education and Religion only in 2019, along with the Defterdar and Gazi Hasan Pasha mosques in the neighbouring island of Kos.

Architecture 
Built within the old medieval town of Rhodes, the mosque consists of a large square room with a twelve-sided dome and two successive pediments alongside the north side. In the northwest corner of the roof, a minaret stands on a polygonal base. An eight-sided fountain can be found in the middle of the yard outside.

The minaret is cylindrical and has one balcony.

Gallery

See also 
 Suleymaniye Mosque (Rhodes)
 List of mosques in Greece
 Islam in Greece

References

External links 
 

Ottoman mosques in Greece
Buildings and structures in Rhodes (city)
16th-century architecture in Greece
16th-century mosques
Rhodes
Mosque buildings with domes
Ottoman architecture in Rhodes